The 1792–93 United States House of Representatives elections were held on various dates in various states between August 27, 1792 and September 6, 1793. Each state set its own date for its elections to the House of Representatives before the first session of the 3rd United States Congress convened on December 2, 1793. With the addition of the new state of Kentucky's representatives, and the congressional reapportionment based on the 1790 United States Census, the size of the House increased to 105 seats.

They coincided with the re-election of President George Washington. While Washington ran for president as an independent, his followers (more specifically, the supporters of Alexander Hamilton) formed the nation's first organized political party, the Federalist Party, whose members and sympathizers are identified as pro-Administration on this page. In response, followers of Thomas Jefferson and James Madison created the opposition Democratic-Republican Party, who are identified as anti-Administration on this page. The Federalists promoted urbanization, industrialization, mercantilism, centralized government, and a broad interpretation of the United States Constitution. In contrast, Democratic-Republicans supported the ideal of an agrarian republic made up of self-sufficient farmers and small, localized governments with limited power.

Despite nearly unanimous support for Washington as a presidential candidate, Jeffersonian ideas edged out Hamiltonian principles at the ballot box for congressional candidates, with the Democratic-Republicans taking 24 seats more than they had prior to the organization of their political movement. Most of the increase was due to the addition of new seats in Western regions as a result of the 1790 Census. Dominated by agrarian culture, these Western territories offered strong support to Democratic-Republican congressional candidates. As a result, they secured a thin majority in the legislature.

Election summaries 
•In this period, each state fixed its own date for a congressional general election, a In this period, each state fixed its own date for a congressional general elections early as August 1792 (in New Hampshire and Rhode Island) and as late as September 1793 (in Kentucky). In some states, the congressional delegation was not elected until after the legal start of the Congress (on the 4th day of March in the odd-numbered year), but as the first session of Congress typically began in November or December, the elections took place before Congress actually met. The 3rd Congress first met on December 2, 1793.

These were the first elections held after reapportionment following the first census. Thirty-six new seats were added, with 1 state losing 1 seat, 3 states having no change, and the remaining 11 states gaining between 1 and 9 seats. This was the first apportionment based on actual census data, the apportionment for the 1st and 2nd Congresses being set by the Constitution using estimated populations.

Change in composition

End of the 2nd Congress 
With new seats, due to reapportionment, outlined.

Result of the elections

Special elections 

There were special elections in 1792 and 1793 during the 2nd and 3rd United States Congresses.

Elections are sorted here by state then district.

2nd Congress 

|-
| 
| colspan=3 | Kentucky admitted June 1, 1792.
|  | New member elected September 7, 1792.Anti-Administration gain.Winner seated November 9, 1792.Winner was later re-elected to the next term, see below.
| nowrap | 

|-
| 
| colspan=3 | Kentucky admitted June 1, 1792.
|  | New member elected September 7, 1792.Anti-Administration gain.Winner seated November 8, 1792.Winner was later re-elected to the next term, see below.
| nowrap | 

|-
| 
| Anthony Wayne
|  | Anti-Administration
| 1791
|  | Incumbent disqualified March 21, 1792.New member elected July 9, 1792.Anti-Administration hold.Winner later lost re-election to the next term, see below.
| nowrap | 

|-
| 
| Joshua Seney
|  | Anti-Administration
| 1789
|  | Incumbent resigned December 6, 1792 to become Chief Justice of Maryland's 3rd Judicial District.New member elected January 7–10, 1793.Pro-Administration gain.Winner was already elected to the next term, see below.
| nowrap | 

|}

3rd Congress 

|-
| 
| Jonathan Sturges
|  | Pro-Administration
| 1788
|  | Incumbent resigned to become Associate Justice of the Connecticut Supreme Court.New member elected April 8, 1793.Pro-Administration hold.
| nowrap | 

|-
| 
| Benjamin Huntington
|  | Pro-Administration
| 1788
|  | Representative-elect resigned.New member elected September 16, 1793.Pro-Administration hold.
| nowrap | 

|-
| 
| Jonathan Ingersoll
|  | Pro-Administration
| 1793 
| rowspan=2  | Representative-elect Ingersoll declined the seat and Representative-elect Mitchell resigned to become U.S. Senator.Two new members elected on a general ticket November 11, 1793.Two Pro-Administration holds.
| rowspan=2 nowrap | 

|-
| 
| Stephen M. Mitchell
|  | Pro-Administration
| 1792

|}

Connecticut 

Connecticut gained two seats in reapportionment following the 1790 census.

|-
| rowspan=7 | 
| James Hillhouse
|  | Pro-Administration
| 1790
| Incumbent re-elected.
| rowspan=7  nowrap | 

|-
| Amasa Learned
|  | Pro-Administration
| 1791 
| Incumbent re-elected.

|-
| Jonathan Sturges
|  | Pro-Administration
| 1788
| Incumbent re-elected.

|-
| Jonathan Trumbull Jr.
|  | Pro-Administration
| 1788
| Incumbent re-elected.

|-
| Jeremiah Wadsworth
|  | Pro-Administration
| 1788
| Incumbent re-elected.

|-
| colspan=3 | None (Seat created)
|  | New seat.New member elected.Pro-Administration gain.

|-
| colspan=3 | None (Seat created)
|  | New seat.New member elected.Pro-Administration gain.

|}

Three special elections followed the 1792 elections in Connecticut after Representatives-elect Sturges and Huntington resigned before the start of Congress and Mitchell was elected to the Senate.

Delaware 

Delaware's apportionment did not change following the 1790 census. As in the 1st and 2nd Congresses, each voter cast votes for two separate candidates, at least one of whom had to be from a different county as the voter.

|-
| 
| John M. Vining
| | Pro-Administration
| 1789
|  | Incumbent lost re-election.New member elected.Anti-Administration hold.Election was later challenged and overturned.
| nowrap | 

|}

Georgia 

Following the 1790 census, Georgia's apportionment was decreased from 3 seats to 2 (the only state whose representation decreased after the census). Georgia switched from separate districts to at-large seats.

|-
| rowspan=3 | 
| Abraham Baldwin
|  | Anti-Administration
| 1789
| Incumbent re-elected.
| rowspan=3 valign=top nowrap | 

|-
| John Milledge
|  | Anti-Administration
| 1792 
|  | Incumbent lost re-election.New member elected.Anti-Administration hold.

|-
| Francis Willis
|  | Anti-Administration
| 1791
|  | Incumbent lost re-election.New member elected.Anti-Administration loss.

|}

Kentucky 

|-
| 
| Christopher Greenup
|  | Anti-Administration
| 1792 
| Incumbent re-elected.
| nowrap | 

|-
| 
| Alexander D. Orr
|  | Anti-Administration
| 1792 
| Incumbent re-elected.
| nowrap | 

|}

Maryland 

Maryland increased from 6 to 8 representatives after the 1790 census. The previous mixed district/at-large system was replaced with a conventional district system.

|-
| 
| Philip Key
|  | Pro-Administration
| 1790
|  | Incumbent lost re-election.New member elected.Pro-Administration hold.
| nowrap | 

|-
| 
| John Francis Mercer
|  | Anti-Administration
| 1791 
| Incumbent re-elected.
| nowrap | 

|-
| 
| colspan=3 | None (District created)
|  | New seat.New member elected.Pro-Administration gain.
| nowrap | 

|-
| 
| colspan=3 | None (District created)
|  | New seat.New member elected.Anti-Administration gain.
| nowrap | 

|-
| 
| colspan=3 | None (District created)
|  | New seat.New member elected.Anti-Administration gain.
| nowrap | 

|-
| 
| colspan=3 | None (District created)
|  | New seat.New member elected.Anti-Administration gain.
| nowrap | 

|-
| 
| Joshua Seney
|  | Anti-Administration
| 1789
|  | Incumbent retired.New member elected.Pro-Administration gain.Incumbent then resigned December 6, 1792 to become Chief Justice of Maryland's 3rd Judicial District.Winner was then also elected to finish the term, see above.
| nowrap | 

|-
| 
| William V. Murray 
|  | Pro-Administration
| 1790
| Incumbent re-elected.
| nowrap | 

|}

Massachusetts 

Following the 1790 Census, Massachusetts's representation increased from eight to fourteen Representatives and was redistricted into four plural districts, plus a single at-large district. The  covered the District of Maine (the modern-day State of Maine).

As before, a majority was required for election, in those districts where a majority was not achieved, additional ballots were required.

|-
| 
| colspan=3 | None (District created)
|  | New seat.New member elected.Anti-Administration gain.
| nowrap | :::

|-
| 
| Benjamin Goodhue
|  | Pro-Administration
| 1789
| Incumbent re-elected.
| nowrap | 

|-
| 
| Elbridge Gerry
|  | Anti-Administration
| 1789
|  | Incumbent lost re-election.New member elected.Pro-Administration gain.
| nowrap | 

|-
| 
| Fisher Ames
|  | Pro-Administration
| 1788
| Incumbent re-elected.
| nowrap | 

|-
| 
| colspan=3 | None (District created)
|  | New seat.New member elected.Pro-Administration gain.
| nowrap | :::

|-
| 
| Theodore Sedgwick
|  | Pro-Administration
| 1789
| Incumbent re-elected.
| nowrap | 

|-
| 
| colspan=3 | None (District created)
|  | New seat.New member elected.Anti-Administration gain.
| nowrap | :::

|-
| 
| Artemas Ward
|  | Pro-Administration
| 1790
| Incumbent re-elected.
| nowrap | 

|-
| 
| George Leonard
|  | Pro-Administration
| 1788
|  | Incumbent lost re-election.New member elected.Pro-Administration hold.
| nowrap | 

|-
| 
| Shearjashub Bourne
|  | Pro-Administration
| 1790
| Incumbent re-elected.
| nowrap | ::

|-
| 
| colspan=3 | None (District created)
|  | New seat.New member elected.Pro-Administration gain.
| nowrap | :::

|-
| 
| colspan=3 | None (District created)
|  | New seat.New member elected.Anti-Administration gain.
| nowrap | ::

|-
| 
| George Thatcher
|  | Pro-Administration
| 1788
| Incumbent re-elected.
| nowrap | 

|-
| 
| colspan=3 | None (District created)
|  | New seat.New member elected.Pro-Administration gain.
| nowrap | 

|}

New Hampshire 

New Hampshire increased from 3 seats to 4 seats after the 1790 census.

|-
| rowspan=4 | 
| Jeremiah Smith
|  | Pro-Administration
| 1790
| Incumbent re-elected.
| rowspan=4 valign=top nowrap | 

|-
| Samuel Livermore
|  | Pro-Administration
| 1789
|  | RetiredAnti-Administration gain.

|-
| Nicholas Gilman
|  | Pro-Administration
| 1789
| Incumbent re-elected.

|-
| colspan=3 | None (Seat created)
|  | New seat.New member elected.Pro-Administration gain.

|}

New Jersey 

Following the 1790 census, New Jersey's apportionment increased from 4 to 5 seats.

|-
| rowspan=5 | 
| Elias Boudinot
|  | Pro-Administration
| 1789
| Incumbent re-elected.
| rowspan=5  nowrap | 

|-
| Abraham Clark
|  | Pro-Administration
| 1791
| Incumbent re-elected.

|-
| Jonathan Dayton
|  | Pro-Administration
| 1791
| Incumbent re-elected.

|-
| Aaron Kitchell
|  | Pro-Administration
| 1791
|  | Incumbent lost re-election.New member elected.Pro-Administration hold.

|-
| colspan=3 | None (Seat created)
|  | New seat.New member elected.Pro-Administration gain.

|}

New York 

Due to re-apportionment following the 1790 census, New York's congressional delegation grew from 6 to 10. Three incumbents ran for re-election, two of whom won, and the other three incumbents retired. With the increase following re-apportionment, this left seven open seats.

|-
| 
| Thomas Tredwell
|  | Anti-Administration
| 1791 
| Incumbent re-elected.
| nowrap | 

|-
| 
| colspan=3 | None (District created)
|  | New seat.New member elected.Pro-Administration gain.
| nowrap | 

|-
| 
| colspan=3 | None (District created)
|  | New seat.New member elected.Anti-Administration gain.
| nowrap | 

|-
| 
| Cornelius C. Schoonmaker
|  | Anti-Administration
| 1790
|  | Incumbent lost re-election.New member elected.Pro-Administration gain.
| nowrap | 

|-
| 
| colspan=3 | None (District created)
|  | New seat.New member elected.Anti-Administration gain.
| nowrap | 

|-
| 
| colspan=3 | None (District created)
|  | New seat.New member elected.Pro-Administration gain.
| nowrap | 

|-
| 
| colspan=3 | None (District created)
|  | New seat.New member elected.Pro-Administration gain.
| nowrap | 

|-
| 
| colspan=3 | None (District created)
|  | New seat.New member elected.Pro-Administration gain.
| nowrap | 

|-
| 
| James Gordon
|  | Pro-Administration
| 1790
| Incumbent re-elected.
| nowrap | 

|-
| 
| colspan=3 | None (District created)
|  | New seat.New member elected.Pro-Administration gain.
| nowrap | 

|}

North Carolina 

Following the 1790 census, North Carolina's apportionment increased from 5 to 10 seats.

|-
| 
| colspan=3 | None (District created)
|  | New seat.New member elected.Anti-Administration gain.
| nowrap | 

|-
| 
| colspan=3 | None (District created)
|  | New seat.New member elected.Anti-Administration gain.
| nowrap | 

|-
| 
| colspan=3 | None (District created)
|  | New seat.New member elected.Anti-Administration gain.
| nowrap | 

|-
| 
| colspan=3 | None (District created)
|  | New seat.New member elected.Anti-Administration gain.
| nowrap | 

|-
| 
| Nathaniel Macon
|  | Anti-Administration
| 1791
| Incumbent re-elected.
| nowrap | 

|-
| 
| colspan=3 | None (District created)
|  | New seat.New member elected.Anti-Administration gain.
| nowrap | 

|-
| 
| William B. Grove
|  | Pro-Administration
| 1791
| Incumbent re-elected.
| nowrap | 

|-
| 
| colspan=3 | None (District created)
|  | New seat.New member elected.Anti-Administration gain.
| nowrap | 

|-
| 
| John B. Ashe
|  | Anti-Administration
| 1790
|  | Incumbent lost re-election.New member elected.Anti-Administration hold.
| nowrap | 

|-
| 
| colspan=3 | None (District created)
|  | New seat.New member elected.Anti-Administration gain.
| nowrap | 

|}

Pennsylvania 

Pennsylvania switched from using districts to electing its representatives on an at-large basis for the 3rd Congress, just as it had done for the 1st Congress. This would be the last time that Pennsylvania would elect all of its Representatives at-large. Due to re-apportionment following the 1790 census, Pennsylvania's delegation increased from 8 representatives to 13.

|-
| rowspan=13|
| Thomas Fitzsimons
|  | Pro-Administration
| 1788
| Incumbent re-elected.
| rowspan=13 valign=top nowrap | 

|-
| Frederick Muhlenberg
|  | Anti-Administration
| 1788
| Incumbent re-elected.

|-
| Israel Jacobs
|  | Pro-Administration
| 1791
|  | Incumbent lost re-election.New member elected.Pro-Administration hold.

|-
| Daniel Hiester
|  | Anti-Administration
| 1788
| Incumbent re-elected.

|-
| John W. Kittera
|  | Pro-Administration
| 1791
| Incumbent re-elected.

|-
| Andrew Gregg
|  | Anti-Administration
| 1791
| Incumbent re-elected.

|-
| Thomas Hartley
|  | Pro-Administration
| 1788
| Incumbent re-elected.

|-
| William Findley
|  | Anti-Administration
| 1791
| Incumbent re-elected.

|-
| colspan=3 | None (Seat created)
|  | New seat.New member elected.Pro-Administration gain.

|-
| colspan=3 | None (Seat created)
|  | New seat.New member elected.Anti-Administration gain.

|-
| colspan=3 | None (Seat created)
|  | New seat.New member elected.Anti-Administration gain.

|-
| colspan=3 | None (Seat created)
|  | New seat.New member elected.Anti-Administration gain.

|-
| colspan=3 | None (Seat created)
|  | New seat.New member elected.Anti-Administration gain.

|}

Rhode Island 

Rhode Island gained a second representative from the results of the 1790 census. Rhode Island did not divide itself into districts, but elected two at-large representatives.

|-
| rowspan=2 | 
| Benjamin Bourne
|  | Pro-Administration
| 1790
| Incumbent re-elected.
| rowspan=2 nowrap | 

|-
| colspan=3 | None (Seat created)
|  | New seat.New member elected.Pro-Administration gain.

|}

South Carolina 

South Carolina gained one representative as a result of the 1790 census, increasing from 5 to 6.

|-
| rowspan=2|
| William L. Smith
|  | Pro-Administration
| 1788
| Incumbent re-elected.
| rowspan=2 nowrap | 
|-
| Thomas Tudor Tucker
|  | Anti-Administration
| 1788
|  | Incumbent lost re-election.Anti-Administration loss.

|-
| 
| colspan=3 | None (District created)
|  | New seat.New member elected.Anti-Administration gain.
| nowrap | 

|-
| 
| colspan=3 | None (District created)
|  | New seat.New member elected.Anti-Administration gain.
| nowrap | 

|-
| 
| colspan=3 | None (District created)
|  | New seat.New member elected.Anti-Administration gain.
| nowrap | 

|-
| 
| colspan=3 | None (District created)
|  | New seat.New member elected.Anti-Administration gain.
| nowrap | 

|-
| 
| colspan=3 | None (District created)
|  | New seat.New member elected.Anti-Administration gain.
| nowrap | 

|}

Vermont 

Vermont had no apportionment in the House of Representatives before 1790 census because it was not admitted to the Union until 1791. Vermont's election laws at the time required a majority to win election to the House of Representatives.

|-
| 
| Israel Smith
|  | Anti-Administration
| 1791
| Incumbent re-elected.
| nowrap | ::

|-
| 
| Nathaniel Niles
|  | Anti-Administration
| 1791
| Incumbent re-elected.
| nowrap | 

|}

Virginia 

Virginia gained nine representatives from the 1790 census, and in addition, the old  was lost after its territory became the new State of Kentucky. There were, therefore, ten new districts created for the 3rd Congress.

|-
| 
| Alexander White
|  | Pro-Administration
| 1789
|  | Incumbent lost re-election.New member elected.Anti-Administration gain.
| nowrap | 

|-
| 
| Andrew Moore
|  | Anti-Administration
| 1789
| Incumbent re-elected.
| nowrap | 

|-
| 
| colspan=3 | None (District created)
|  | New seat.New member elected.Anti-Administration gain.
| nowrap | 

|-
| 
| colspan=3 | None (District created)
|  | New seat.New member elected.Anti-Administration gain.Results subsequently challenged but upheld.
| nowrap | 

|-
| 
| colspan=3 | None (District created)
|  | New seat.New member elected.Pro-Administration gain.
| nowrap | 

|-
| 
| colspan=3 | None (District created)
|  | New seat.New member elected.Anti-Administration gain.
| nowrap | 

|-
| 
| Abraham B. Venable
|  | Anti-Administration
| 1790
| Incumbent re-elected.
| nowrap | 

|-
| 
| colspan=3 | None (District created)
|  | New seat.New member elected.Anti-Administration gain.
| nowrap | 

|-
| 
| William B. Giles
|  | Anti-Administration
| 1790
| Incumbent re-elected.
| nowrap | 

|-
| 
| colspan=3 | None (District created)
|  | New seat.New member elected.Anti-Administration gain.
| nowrap | 

|-
| 
| Josiah Parker
|  | Anti-Administration
| 1789
|  | Incumbent re-elected.as Pro-Administration
| nowrap | 

|-
| 
| John Page
|  | Anti-Administration
| 1789
| Incumbent re-elected.
| nowrap | 

|-
| 
| Samuel Griffin
|  | Anti-Administration
| 1789
|  | Incumbent re-elected.as Pro-Administration
| nowrap | 

|-
| 
| colspan=3 | None (District created)
|  | New seat.New member elected.Anti-Administration gain.
| nowrap | 

|-
| 
| James Madison Jr.
|  | Anti-Administration
| 1789
| Incumbent re-elected.
| nowrap | 

|-
| 
| colspan=3 | None (District created)
|  | New seat.New member elected.Anti-Administration gain.
| nowrap | 

|-
| 
| Richard Bland Lee
|  | Pro-Administration
| 1789
| Incumbent re-elected.
| nowrap | 

|-
| 
| colspan=3 | None (District created)
|  | New seat.New member elected.Anti-Administration gain.
| nowrap | 

|-
| 
| colspan=3 | None (District created)
|  | New seat.New member elected.Anti-Administration gain.
| nowrap | 

|}

See also 
 1792 United States elections
 List of United States House of Representatives elections (1789–1822)
 1792–93 United States Senate elections
 1792 United States presidential election
 2nd United States Congress
 3rd United States Congress

Notes

References

Bibliography

External links 
 Office of the Historian (Office of Art & Archives, Office of the Clerk, U.S. House of Representatives)